Hialeah Market is a Tri-Rail commuter rail station in Hialeah, Florida. The station is located on Southeast 10th Court near Southeast 14th Street, opening to January 1989 as Miami Airport station. It was the southern terminus of Tri-Rail line until a new station was built closer to the airport in 1998. The name was changed to Hialeah Market Station at this point. The other Miami Airport station was closed on September 12, 2011, and this station's name was changed to Hialeah Market/Miami Airport station. The name was changed back to Hialeah Market station again in 2015 after Tri-Rail began serving Miami Airport station. Parking is available at this station. Immediately north of the station is the historic Hialeah Seaboard Air Line Railway Station.

Station layout
The station has two tracks but only one side platform. The station building, parking, and bus stops are west of the platform.

Places of interest
Hialeah Seaboard Air Line Railway Station

References

External links 

South Florida Regional Transportation Authority – Hialeah Market station

Tri-Rail stations in Miami-Dade County, Florida
Railway stations in the United States opened in 1989
1989 establishments in Florida
Transportation in Hialeah, Florida